Fraternal Democrats was an international society, founded at a meeting held in London on September 22. 1845. The society embraced representatives of Left Chartists, German workers and craftsmen – members of the League of the Just – and revolutionary emigrants of other nationalities. During their stay in England in the summer of 1845, Karl Marx and Friedrich Engels helped in preparing for the meeting but did not attend it as they had by then left London. Later they kept in constant touch with the Fraternal Democrats trying to influence the proletarian core of the society, which joined the Communist League in 1847, and through it the Chartist movement. The society ceased its activities in 1853.

References

Defunct international non-governmental organizations
Organizations established in 1845
Organizations disestablished in 1853